Killin' Time is the debut studio album by American country music singer-songwriter Clint Black. It was released on May 2, 1989, by RCA Nashville. The album, buoyed by the chart-topping success of its first four singles, was a huge hit upon its release, and established Black as one of the biggest new stars in country music. The album is currently certified triple platinum by the RIAA.

"A Better Man", "Nothing's News", "Walking Away", "Nobody's Home", and "Killin' Time" were all huge hit songs. All of these except "Nothing's News" reached Number One on the Billboard Hot Country Singles and Hot Country Singles & Tracks (now Hot Country Songs) chart, while "Nothing's News" reached No. 3. In addition, "A Better Man" and "Nobody's Home" were declared the Number One songs of 1989 and 1990, respectively, according to Billboard.

Critical reception
The Los Angeles Times wrote that "Black has a winning vocal style that evokes a very young Merle Haggard at times, and musically he can Western-swing just as hard as fellow Texan George Strait, which he proves on the delightful 'Straight From the Factory'."

Track listing

Personnel

Band
Clint Black – acoustic guitar, harmonica, lead vocals, background vocals
Dick Gay – drums
Rob Hajacos – fiddle
Jana King – background vocals
Randy McCormick – keyboards
Craig Morris – background vocals
Hayden Nicholas – acoustic guitar, electric guitar, background vocals
Mark O'Connor – fiddle
John Permenter – fiddle
Jeff Peterson – Dobro, steel guitar
Jim Photoglo – background vocals
Donna Rhodes – background vocals
Brent Rowan – electric guitar
Harry Stinson – background vocals
Wendy Waldman – background vocals
Jake Willemain – bass guitar
Reggie Young - electric guitar

Production
Milan Bogdan – editing
Bill Ham – executive producer
Steve Lindsey – production coordinator
Glenn Meadows – mastering
Lynn Peterzell – engineer, mixing
Scott Poston – production coordinator
James Stroud – producer
Mark Wright – producer

Chart positions

Weekly charts

Year-end charts

Singles

Certifications

References

Killin' Time [CD liner notes]. 1989. RCA Records.
[ Killin' Time Credits]. AllMusic. Retrieved on March 10, 2003.
[ Artist Chart History (Singles)]. Billboard. Retrieved on March 10, 2003.
[ Artist Chart History (Albums)]. Billboard. Retrieved on March 10, 2003.

1989 debut albums
Clint Black albums
RCA Records albums
Albums produced by James Stroud
Albums produced by Mark Wright (record producer)